Freda Swain (19021985) was a British composer, pianist and music educator.

Biography
Freda Swain was born in Portsmouth, England on 31 October 1902, the daughter of Thomas and Gertrude (née Allen) Swain. Her first piano lessons (from age 11) were at the Tobias Matthay Piano School in London, given by Matthay's sister Dora. Three years later she went to study composition with Charles Villiers Stanford and piano with Arthur Alexander at the Royal College of Music, earning awards including the Sullivan Prize in 1921.

In 1924 Swain began teaching at the Royal College and in 1936 she founded the British Music Movement to help promote the efforts of young composers and artists. Swain married Arthur Alexander in 1921, and before World War II the couple toured South Africa and Australia, lecturing, broadcasting and performing recitals. They were both on the founding board of the Surrey College of Music from the mid-1940s. From 1942 they lived in a bungalow on Chinnor Hill in Oxfordshire. Freda Swain died on 29 January 1985.

Composition
Swain wrote some 450 pieces, piano and chamber music as well as many songs, but also opera and orchestral works, including two piano concertos and a clarinet concerto. Few were performed aside from a series featured in the NEMO Series of concerts that Swain herself founded after the war. Her first major success was The Harp of Aengus for violin and orchestra (after the Yeats poem), with soloist Achille Rivarde at the Queen's Hall in January 1925. The solo Violin Sonata was premiered by May Harrison at the Wigmore Hall on 8 December 1933. Her ‘Airmail’ Piano Concerto, mailed in instalments to her husband Arthur Alexander while he was stuck in South Africa during World War II, was performed by Alexander in Cape Town. She composed a one-act opera Second Chance, but left two other operas incomplete.

Piano compositions include three large scale piano sonatas and 40 or so other works for solo piano, including many educational pieces. There is also a substantial cello sonata, two violin sonatas (one with piano, the other unaccompanied), two string quartets, a piano quartet, a sextet with horn and clarinet, a Suite for Six Trumpets and many other chamber and instrumental pieces.

Swain's surviving manuscripts were handed down to her pupil and friend David Stevens, founder of the Swain-Alexander Trust. In turn they were passed on to Swiss pianist Timon Altwegg in 2005, who has begun recording the piano works for Toccata Classics.

Selected works
Chamber
Dance Forms from an Unknown Country, for flute, oboe, clarinet and piano (1958)
 Festival Suite for horn, piano and percussion (1967)
 Lamentations, for 2 cellos and piano (1960)
 Piano Quintet (1938)
The Sea for piano quartet (1938)
 Sextet (with horn and clarinet)
 Solemn Salutation for brass ensemble (1951)
 String Quartet No 1 in E minor Norfolk (1924)
 String Quartet No 2 in G minor (1949)
 Suite for Six Trumpets (1952)
 Tercet for violin, viola and cello

Instrumental
 By the Loch for cello and piano (1960)
Cello Sonata in C
Contrasts (1953) for clarinet and piano ('Heather Hill' and 'Derry Down')
A Country Pastoral for organ (1957)
Danse Barbare for violin and cello
English Reel for viola and piano (1958)
 English Pastoral for organ (1958)
Fantasy Suite for oboe and piano
 Laburnum Tree for clarinet and piano (1960)
 Pipe Tunes for clarinet and piano
 Rhapsody for clarinet and piano (for Frederick Thurston)
Sonata for violin in C minor
Sonata for violin in B minor, The River
Sonata for violin in G minor (No 4?) (1947)
Song at Evening for viola and piano (1958)
 Summer Rhapsody No 1 for viola and piano (performed 1936)
 Waving Grass for clarinet and piano (1960)
The Willow Tree for clarinet and piano (1948)

Orchestral
 Clarinet Concerto
 Concertino for clarinet, horn and strings
The Harp of Angus (1925), tone poem for violin and orchestra
 Miniature Suite for string orchestra (1952)
 A Pastoral Fantasy (1936-7)
 Piano Concerto 'Airmail' (1939)
 Piano Concerto
 Walking and Dream Tide for string orchestra (or cello and piano)

Opera
Second Chance, premiered at Bath in 1955, libretto Swain and M. Rodd
 The Shadowy Waters (operatic setting, based on Yeats)
 The Spell (incomplete)

Piano
 The Croon of the Sea (1920)
 Crossbow Castle (suite, four pieces)
 An English Idyll (1942)
 Humoresque
 Mountain Ash (1931)
 Prelude and Toccata (1955)
 The Red Flower
Scherzo for three pianos
Sonata Saga in F minor (1924, rev. 1929 and 1930)
 Sonata No 1 in A minor, The Skerries (1936-7, rev. 1945)
 Sonata No 2 in F sharp minor (1950)
Sonatina
 Two South Africa Impressions: 'Mimosa' and 'The Lonely Dove'
 Spring Mood
 Waltz Charming
The Windmill

Songs
 April (text: A. E. Coppard)
Blessing (text: Austin Clarke)
 The Chevalier's Lament (text: Robert Burns)
Experience (Chinese text: translated Arthur Waley) 
The Green Lad From Donegal
 The Indwelling, song cycle for voices, strings, piano and drum (fp. 1961)
The Lark on Portsdown Hill (text: composer)
 Sweet Content (text: Robert Greene)
 Sympathy (text: Emily Brontë)
Winter Field
 over 100 songs, including settings of Bridges, A. E. Housman and Shakespeare

Choral
 Bells of Heaven (Christmas carol, text: Mary Brandon)
Breathe on Me, Breath of God, anthem
 Cantata In memoriam
A Gaelic Prayer, anthem
 Now Rest We All Content (wedding anthem, text: Mary Brandon)
 Psalm 150 (1973)
 Rejoice in the Lord (1961)
 Unseen Heralds (text: Mary Brandon)

External links
 Portrait of Freda Swain, by Ena Limbeek
 Freda Swain: Piano Music, Volume One, Toccata Classics
 Song at Evening, Helen Callus and Philip Bush

References

1902 births
1985 deaths
British classical composers
British music educators
Women classical composers
Musicians from Portsmouth
20th-century classical composers
20th-century British composers
Alumni of the Royal Academy of Music
Academics of the Royal Academy of Music
20th-century English women musicians
Women music educators
20th-century women composers